Work the Walls is a studio album released on July 7, 1992 by Washington, D.C.-based go-go band Rare Essence.  The album consist of thirteen tracks, including the charting singles "Work the Walls" and "Lock It" (which was originally released on the soundtrack to the film Strictly Business.

Track listing

Personnel
 Charles "Shorty Corleone" Garris – vocals
 Andre "Whiteboy" Johnson – electric guitar, vocals
 Michael "Funky Ned" Neal – bass guitar
 Donnell Floyd – vocals, saxophone
 Kent Wood – keyboards
 Milton "Go-Go Mickey" Freeman – congas, percussion
 Derick Paige – trumpet, vocals

References

External links
Work the Walls at Discogs.com

1992 albums
Rare Essence albums